Nicodamus peregrinus, known as the red and black spider, is a spider found in eastern and southern Australia. Unlike the redback spider (Latrodectus hasseltii), the bright red coloration does not appear to warn of significant danger to humans. Food is a variety of small insects. They have been recorded in Queensland, New South Wales, Victoria and South Australia.

Description and egg sac 
Usually found under bark, fallen trees or stones close to the ground. Legs are red and black. The cephalothorax is red, the abdomen is black or sometimes a dark blue. Palps are red and black. Body length of males is 8 to 10 mm, females 12 to 14 mm. The egg sac is 10 to 20 mm in diameter and contains from 30 to 50 cream eggs, 1 mm in diameter. The sac is plano-convex in shape, consisting of white fluffy silk, placed in a sheltered area such as under bark.  Near continual courtship and mating have been observed when in captivity, resulting in the exhaustive death of the males. These spiders tend to wave their forelegs in the air while walking, and the males tap the ground with their palps.

Naming & taxonomy 
This spider belongs to the family Nicodamidae. However, it has also been placed in the families Theridiidae, Agelenidae and Zodariidae. It was originally named by the French arachnologist Charles Walckenaer as Theridion peregrinum in 1841. However, there have been several name changes and synonymisations. The most recent being in 1995, after a revision of the family Nicodamidae, when the name Centropelma bicolorwas synonymised with Nicodamus peregrinus. Walckenaer's original specific epithet peregrinum refers to the wandering nature of the spider.

References

Nicodamidae
Spiders of Australia
Spiders described in 1841